A national church is a Christian church associated with a specific ethnic group or nation state. The idea was notably discussed during the 19th century, during the emergence of modern nationalism.

Samuel Taylor Coleridge, in a draft discussing the question of church and state around 1828 wrote that 
"a National Church might exist, and has existed, without Christianity, because before the institution of the Christian Church - as [...] the Levitical Church in the Hebrew Constitution, [and] the Druidical in the Celtic, would suffice to prove".

John Wordsworth, Bishop of Salisbury, wrote about the National Church of Sweden in 1911, interpreting the Church of Sweden and the Church of England as national churches of the Swedish and the English peoples, respectively.

The concept of a national church remains alive in the Protestantism of United Kingdom and Scandinavia in particular. While, in a context of England, the national church remains a common denominator for the Church of England, some of the Lutheran "folk churches" of Scandinavia, characterized as national churches in the ethnic sense as opposed to the idea of a state church, emerged in the second half of the 19th century following the lead of Grundtvig. However, in countries in which the state church (also known as the established church) has the following of the majority of citizens, the state church may also be the national church, and may be declared as such by the government, e.g. Church of Denmark, Church of Greece, and Church of Iceland.

Countries and regions with national churches

Ethnic groups

Criticism 
Karl Barth denounced as heretical the tendency of "nationalizing" the Christian God, especially in the context of national churches sanctioning warfare against other Christian nations during World War I.

See also

 Christian nationalism
 Christian amendment 
 Christian right
 Christian state
 Phyletism
 State church

Notes

References

 William Reed Huntington, A National Church, Bedell lectures, Scribner's, 1897.

Types of Christian organization
Christian terminology
Church
 
Anglicanism
Catholicism and politics
Lutheranism
Eastern Orthodox Church
Oriental Orthodoxy